WFGS (103.7 FM, "Froggy 103.7") is a radio station located in Murray, Kentucky licensed by the Federal Communications Commission (FCC) and owned by Forever Communications. The station airs a country music format.  Froggy 103.7 is one of the most listened to radio stations in Western Kentucky and Northwest Tennessee for country music.

History
The station went on the air as WAAW in 1977, owned by Murray Broadcasting Company.  Its format was album oriented rock.  In 1988, the station was sold to Jackson Purchase Broadcasting, which changed the call to WBLN ("The Blend") and made the format adult contemporary.  After being sold to Forever Communications, 103.7 became a country station with the call sign WFGE on 1997-03-17. In July 2008, the owner elected to move the Murray station's call sign to another station with the Froggy branding based in Pennsylvania.  The old WFGE then became WFGS.

Events
Froggy 103.7 (along with sister stations WNBS and WBZB) hold different events through the year, and this is a list of some of them.

Annual Home, Lawn & Farm Show – This event dates back over 20 years (the first being held in 1989).  It has always been the expo for vendors to show off their wares.  There are always vendors that cater to different parts of the show, whether they represent home, lawn or farm.  Often there are also "sub category" areas, like; Children's Play Area, Women's World or the Men's Sit a Spell.  This event always occurs within the first quarter of the year.  The Annual Home, Lawn & Farm show calls Murray State's CFSB Center home currently, thus scheduling is subject to Murray State University basketball games and/or other promotions that are brought in.  The last of this event was in 2013.
Annual Indoor / Outdoor Expo – Due to declining numbers in attendance (both by vendors and the public) and constant schedule changes to work around special events and sporting events at the CFSB Center the "Home, Lawn & Farm Show" was cancelled and re-branded as the "Indoor / Outdoor Show" in 2014.  Instead of focusing on products and serviced for the home, the Indoor / Outdoor Expo became a catch-all for any and all vendors to participate in an expo, no matter the category.
Mr. Froggy's Birthday – His birthday is March 17 and is more often than not celebrated by the station on the weekend closest to it.  For the first eight years, Froggy 103 used Mr. Froggy's birthday as a platform to announce their annual Froggy Fest concert line-up.  In more recent years the station has taken a more fun, party like approach, in actually throwing Mr. Froggy a birthday party where all of Froggyland is invited.  The birthday party approach has worked very well with hundreds of kids (with their parents in tow) every year.  With the birthday party approach there are inflatable jumpers, karaoke, face painting, coloring pages, free cookies/cupcakes and prizes for the kids.

Syndication
Froggy 103.7 airs CMT Country Countdown USA featuring Lon Helton. Other syndicated shows include Lia.

Sports
Froggy 103.7 is the home to the Murray State University Racers football and basketball. In May 2015 MSU announced their renewal of their contract with WFGS through the 2019-2020 seasons for both football and basketball. Although the press release had not been updated since 2007, as noted by the incorrect call letters of WFGE.

The station, for a short time, was an affiliate for Tennessee Titans football.  Beginning in the fall of 2008 the station also started airing the "Cross Town Classic" between Murray High School and Calloway County High School.

In 2008 the station became even more involved in the local communities by launching Froggyland Sports.  The site offers an in depth look at high school sports in much of the broadcast air, known as "Froggyland".  Froggyland Sports is updated by Travis Turner who hosts his sports talk show on brother station WBZB ESPN The Office.  WFGS, WNBS, & WBZB all act as the "voice" of Murray High School Sports and Calloway County Basketball.  Games are aired on all three stations as well as on the internet at Froggylandsports.Com.

References

External links
Froggy 103.7 home page
Froggy 103.7 Twitter
Froggyland Sports
Forever Communications
 

FGS
Radio stations established in 1977
Murray, Kentucky
1977 establishments in Kentucky